Hajjiabad-e Do (also Romanized as Ḩājjīābād-e Do; also known as Ḩājīābād) is a village in Gowdin Rural District, in the Central District of Kangavar County, Kermanshah Province, Iran. At the 2006 census, its population was 63, in 15 families.

References 

Populated places in Kangavar County